Trichopetalum may refer to:

Trichopetalum (millipede), a genus of millipedes
Trichopetalum (plant), a genus of plants